Dimitar Lukanov (Bulgarian: Димитър Луканов, born February 23, 1969, Plovdiv, Bulgaria) is internationally renowned Bulgarian-American artist.

Early life and art education
In 1982 Dimitar Lukanov chaired the World's Children Parliament in the Nicholas Roerich-inspired International Assembly "Banner of Peace" in Sofia with 135 countries participating.

He began his studies at the art school of his hometown, worked in a foundry of bronze in Sofia, studied for a year at the Hudojestvena Akademija there and in 1991 left on a full scholarship to continue in Paris. 
He attended École Parsons in Paris France (1991–93), graduating at the top of the class with honors from Parsons School of Design, New York City (BFA, honors, 1994). In 2003 Dimitar was selected among the Top 100 alumni of all times of the 90-year-old Parsons The New School University of Design among the likes of Jasper Johns, Edward Hopper, Norman Rockwell, Donna Karan, Marc Jacobs and others. His studies were fully funded by an Helene David-Weill Scholarship.

Dimitar was awarded full scholarship to the highly selective Skowhegan School of Painting and Sculpture, Maine, USA (1995), and Columbia University Scholarship for his graduate studies at School of the Arts, Columbia University, New York City (MFA, 1997).

Teaching
During the period between 1998 and 2006 Dimitar was a visiting professor and guest lecturer in the United States, France, Mexico, and the Dominican Republic. He taught various visual art classes at Parsons' New York campus and led courses in "Intensive Painting and Drawing" for Parsons School of Design in Paris in 1999, 2000 and 2001. Most recently, he was a guest lecturer and critic at the graduate program of Herberger Institute for Design and the Arts at Arizona State University. Lukanov also collaborates on various arts-in-education projects in New York. He was a consultant visual artist doing sculpture and painting murals with NYC Department of Education Special Programs and his students' work was exhibited at the Staten Island Children’s Museum.

Activities
Created the monumental sculpture "Outside Time" for renovated JFK's Terminal 4. The signature piece is the core part of a three-work public sculpture project, commissioned to Mr. Lukanov by JFK IAT in December 2012. A structural feat, the unique and ambitious monumental piece is 90% airborne even if it is pronouncedly inclined. The steel and aluminum sculptural work is comprised by some 600 elements as well as 1000 ft of tubing, all hand-bent and assembled by the author.

Commissioned and executed in the lost-wax technique in 2006, "Light to Sky" is a major public art sculpture project at International Arrivals, Terminal 4, at Kennedy Airport, New York. "Light to Sky" is at the top of the annual editorial review of leading US magazine "Art in America" for the 20 most important public art projects in the United States for 2006.

Dimitar Lukanov was awarded Pollock-Krasner Foundation grant for 2011.

2007 – "Silent Wave" inaugurates Yue-Sai Kan lifestyle gallery project "House of Yue-Sai" in Shanghai.

In 2006 and 2007 Dimitar was an invited guest-artist by ArtCultureStudio, Geneva, for the Moscow World Art Fair at the Manezh.

Dimitar Lukanov is a member of the Chilean Association of Painters and Sculptors, Santiago, Chile (since 2010).

Selected exhibitions
 2018-9: Three sculptures, MVGO pedestrian bridge, Amsterdam, NY
2010: L'Heritage International Gallery, Moscow 2008: Izbrannoe Gallery, Moscow, Russia
 2008: Silent Wave, House of Yue-Sai Kan commission, Shanghai, China
 2006: Light to Sky, sculpture commission, permanent installation, International Air terminal, Terminal 4, John F. Kennedy International Airport, New York
 2006-7: Moscow International Art Exhibition, Manezh, galerie George de Bartha, Geneva
 2007: Sculpture, Maison d'Art, Monte Carlo
 2006: Shanghai International Art Festival Exhibition, Shanghai, China
 2006-7: Art Loves Design, Sculpture exhibit, NiBa Home, Miami, FL
 2005: Hodgell Gallery, Sarasota, Forecast Gallery; Holly Hunt, Miami, FL
 2005: Lo River Arts Gallery, Beacon, NY
 2003: Sculpture at Ordway, Sculpture/Prints, Washington DC
 2002: Firewind, Galerie Hopkins & Custot, Paris, France
 2001: Transparent Volcano, Sculpture, Olivier Mousson Artpluriel, Paris,
 2001: Salto de Agua, International Sculptural Garden Punta Sur, Isla Mujeres, (permanent installation, Mexican Government commission);
 2001: Invited Artist, festival de Arte, Expresarte, Mexico City, Mexico
 2000: Storms, Sculpture, Drawing, Painting, Axel Raben Gallery, New York
 2000: New Outlooks, New Jersey Center for Visual Arts, Summit, NJ
 1999: Conversation with Mountains, International Art House Lilia Yakov, Plovdiv
 1998: Holzhausen Sculptural Park Concept, Neiheim, Germany
 1998: Sculptural Vectors, York College Art Gallery, Jamaica, Queens, NY
 1997: Four Invited Artists, Casa de Chavon, Casa de Campo, Dominican Rep.
 1997: Museo Arquelogico, Altos de Chavon, Casa de Campo, Domini. Rep.
 1997: WorkSurface Exhibit, American Institute of Architecture, Chicago, IL
 1996: Lithographs & Other Prints, Maison Francaise, Columbia University, New York

References

Additional references
 Where a Sculptor Goes to Develop Ideas, Wall Street Journal, June 11, 2015
 Atlanta Office of Cultural Affairs | Dimitar Lukanov
 Iowa Arts Council, Iowa Art in State Buildings Program
 Dimitar Lukanov Sculptures Take Flight at JFK, HamptonsArtHub, 5/1/2014
 This Sculpture Suspends Time And Space At JFK Airport by Sarah Fernandez, Puddingstone Post, 2/28/2014
 JFK Adds New Work of Public Art by Dimitar Lukanov Quest Magazine, 3/27/201
 "Outside Time" A Sculpture Made to Alleviate Stress at JFK Airport’s Terminal 4, by Christopher Inoa, Untappedcities.com, 02/27/2014
 A NYC Art Installation You Have To Actually Be Leaving The City To See, Artiholics, 2/26/2014
 The Moodie Report JFK Airport Terminal 4 marks record year with 17 million travelers, Published: 08/01/15 Source: ©The Moodie Report By Elly Glendenning
 New Installation at JFK’s Terminal 4 Floats Weightlessly in Air, archpaper.com ART, East, Thursday, March 13, 2014 by Henry Melcher
 Металлический воздух Димитара Луканова в аэропорту Джона Кеннеди, Russian Design Hub, March 5, 2014 by Анжелина Вин
 Interior Design China, May 24, 2007
 Art at Airports: Kill Time Viewing Famous and Local Art SeatMaestro, 5/3/2015
 World famous artist visits PS 20 to work with parents and students, May 11, 2015
 Apech.es.tl
 Blog.sina.com
 Blog.sina.com
 New York Daily News, January 15, 2006
 Art in America Magazine, Annual 2006–2007 Museums Galleries Artists, No. 7, Editorial Public Art page 56
 Frame Magazine, China, No. 7, 2009, Editorial Profile, Pages 162 – 175
 Interior Design, China, No. 3, 2007, Pages 96 – 98
 Elle декор россия, май 2007, Persona Elle Decor, Pages 64 – 66
 Casa & Estilo Internacional Magazine, Abril/Mayo 2006, Editorial C&E Arte, Page 36, Miami, FL
 Shanghai Art Fair Catalog May 2006, Maison d'Art Monaco, Shanghai, China
 Mениджър Magazine, No. 1(135), Cофия, януари 2010
 вестник Cтандарт, Cофия, брой 4806, 26 Maй 2006, интервю

1969 births
Living people
Bulgarian artists
Bulgarian expatriates in the United States
Columbia University School of the Arts alumni
Skowhegan School of Painting and Sculpture alumni